Kevin Krawietz and Andreas Mies were the defending champions but chose not to defend their title.

Sadio Doumbia and Fabien Reboul won the title after defeating Ivan and Matej Sabanov 6–4, 3–6, [10–7] in the final.

Seeds

Draw

References

External links
 Main draw

Sibiu Open - Doubles
2019 Doubles